Bursera refers to a genus of plants with about 100 described species

It also refers to:

Botany
Bursera graveolens, known in Spanish as palo santo ("Holy Wood”), is a wild tree in South America
Bursera bipinnata is a Mesoamerican species of trees widespread across Mexico and Central America
Bursera excelsa, the copal, is a species of plants found along the Pacific coast of Mexico. 
Bursera glabrifolia is a species of tree native to central Mexico
Burseraceae are a moderate-sized family of 17-19 genus and about 540 species of flowering plants.

Geography
Bursera, Bokaro, a census town in Jharkhand, India